John Norris Bahcall (December 30, 1934 – August 17, 2005) was an American astrophysicist and the Richard Black Professor for Astrophysics at the Institute for Advanced Study.  He was known for a wide range of contributions to solar, galactic and extragalactic astrophysics, including the solar neutrino problem, the development of the Hubble Space Telescope and for his leadership and development of the Institute for Advanced Study in Princeton.

Early and family life
Bahcall was born into a Jewish family in Shreveport, Louisiana on December 30, 1934, and would later describe an early aspiration to become a Reform rabbi.  He did not take science classes at high school.  In high school he was a state tennis champion and a national debate champion (1952).  

Bahcall married  Princeton University astrophysics professor Neta Bahcall, whom he met as a graduate student at the Weizmann Institute in the 1960s.  They had a daughter and two sons.  He died in New York on 17 August 2005 from a rare blood disorder.

Academic career
Bahcall began his university studies at Louisiana State University as a philosophy student on a tennis scholarship, where he considered pursuing the rabbinate.  At the end of his freshmen year, he transferred to the University of California, Berkeley, still studying philosophy.  He took his first physics class to fulfill a graduation science requirement, later saying:

Bahcall switched majors to physics,  and graduated with an AB in Physics from Berkeley in 1956. He obtained his MS in physics in 1957 from the University of Chicago and his PhD in physics from Harvard in 1961.
He spent a year as a research fellow in physics with Emil Konopinski at Indiana University.  From 1962-1970, he worked with a group led by William Fowler at the Kellogg Laboratory of the California Institute of Technology,. first as a research fellow and later as an Assistant and Associate Professor.

Bahcall joined the Institute for Advanced Study in Princeton, New Jersey in 1968 becoming a professor of natural sciences in 1971 and the Richard Black Professor of Natural Sciences in 1997.  

Bahcall became a member of the National Academy of Sciences in 1976.  
He was president of the American Astronomical Society from 1990–92, and was president-elect of the American Physical Society at the date of his death.

Research
Bahcall published over six hundred scientific papers and wrote or edited nine books on astrophysics.
Bahcall is most notable for his work in establishing the standard solar model. He spent much of his life pursuing the solar neutrino problem with physical chemist Raymond Davis, Jr.  Together, Davis and Bahcall collaborated on the Homestake Experiment. To test Bahcall's theoretical predictions, Davis created an underground detector for neutrinos in a South Dakota gold mine, essentially a large tank filled with cleaning fluid. The flux of neutrinos found by the detector was one-third the amount theoretically predicted by Bahcall, a discrepancy that took over thirty years to resolve. Bahcall’s ongoing research in this area resulted in publication of his book, Neutrino Astrophysics (1989), considered a standard reference on solar neutrinos.

The 2002 Nobel Prize in physics was awarded to Davis and Masatoshi Koshiba for their pioneering work in observing the neutrinos predicted from Bahcall's solar model, thereby vindicating Bahcall's prediction.

In addition to his work on solar neutrinos, Bahcall collaborated with Eli Waxman on the Waxman-Bahcall bound for high energy neutrinos.  This bound sets a limit on high energy neutrino flux based on the observed flux of high energy cosmic rays. It was not possible to verify this prediction until after his death, with the construction of neutrino telescopes capable of detecting very high energy neutrinos, such as the  IceCube Neutrino Observatory.

Another contribution of Bahcall to astrophysics was the development and implementation of the Hubble Space Telescope, in collaboration with Lyman Spitzer, Jr., from the 1970s through to the period after the telescope was launched in 1990. 
In 1992, Bahcall received the NASA Distinguished Service Medal for this work.  He reintroduced the traditional method of star counts, as a quantitative tool for assessing galactic structure. 

The standard model of a galaxy, with a massive black hole surrounded by stars, is known as the Bahcall-Wolf model. The Bahcall-Soneira model was for many years the standard model for the structure of the Milky Way. He also contributed to accurate astrophysical models of stellar interiors.

Honors
2006, Exceptional Scientific Achievement Medal (posthumous), NASA
2004, Academy of Achievement, Golden Plate Award
2004, Comstock Prize in Physics from the National Academy of Sciences
2003, Gold Medal of the Royal Astronomical Society
2003, Benjamin Franklin Medal (with Raymond Davis, Jr. and Masatoshi Koshiba)
2003, Dan David Prize
2003, Fermi Award (with Raymond Davis, Jr)
2001, Member of the American Philosophical Society
1999, Henry Norris Russell Lectureship
 1998, National Medal of Science
1998, Hans Bethe Prize
1994, Heineman Prize\
1992, NASA Distinguished Public Service Medal, NASA
1976, Fellow of the American Academy of Arts and Sciences
1970, Helen B. Warner Prize

References

External links

 Solar neutrinos: history
 Institute for Advanced Study:
 Homepage
 Biography
 Press release following his death
 PBS Nova: The Ghost Particle
 Letter from his family after his death

1934 births
2005 deaths
American astronomers
California Institute of Technology faculty
C. E. Byrd High School alumni
Enrico Fermi Award recipients
Fellows of the American Academy of Arts and Sciences
Harvard Graduate School of Arts and Sciences alumni
Indiana University faculty
Institute for Advanced Study faculty
Louisiana State University alumni
Members of the United States National Academy of Sciences
National Medal of Science laureates
People from Princeton, New Jersey
People from Shreveport, Louisiana
Recipients of the Gold Medal of the Royal Astronomical Society
UC Berkeley College of Letters and Science alumni
University of Chicago alumni
Jewish American scientists
Winners of the Dannie Heineman Prize for Astrophysics
Fellows of the American Physical Society
Burials at Princeton Cemetery
20th-century American Jews
21st-century American Jews
Members of the American Philosophical Society